Committee of Fifty could refer to one of the following:

Committee of Fifty (1829), met in New York City and advocated redistribution of property between the poor and rich
Committee of Fifty (1893), formed by scholars to  investigate problems associated with the use and abuse of alcoholic beverages
Committee of Fifty (1906), called into existence by Mayor Eugene Schmitz during the 1906 San Francisco earthquake

See also
Committee of 100 (disambiguation)
Committee of Seventy, a group in Philadelphia best known for monitoring elections
Committee of Sixty, a group formed in New York City in 1775 to enforce the boycott of British goods
Committee of 19, a committee of students at Auburn University involve in the War on Hunger
Committee of Fifteen, a New York City citizens' group that lobbied for the elimination of prostitution and gambling
Committee of Fourteen, an association dedicated to the abolition of Raines law hotels in New York City
Committee of Ten, a group of educators that recommended the standardization of American high school curriculum
Committee of Nine, a group of state leaders involved in unifying the country following the American Civil War
Committee of Six, six men also known as the Secret Six who secretly funded the American abolitionist, John Brown
Committee of Five, the group delegated to draft the United States Declaration of Independence